Emelio "Chieffy" Asada Caligdong (born September 28, 1982) is a Filipino football head coach and former player. He is currently the head coach of the Ontario Development League Boys under-15 team, and also an assistant coach for North Mississauga SC's under-13 team.

Caligdong played as a left winger for the Philippines national team, of which he is a former captain. At the club level, he played for Philippine Air Force and Green Archers United of the United Football League. At that time, he was also an enlisted member of the Philippine Air Force.

After retiring, he coached Green Archers United, the Philippines' youth teams, and the Perpetual Altas.

Early life
Emelio Asada Caligdong was born on 28 September 1982. in Pototan, Iloilo. He first played football when he was five years old and was encouraged by his brother Roberto to play the sport who was a member of the University of Santo Tomas football team and the national team. Caligdong was more known by his nickname "Chieffy" due to his grandfather being the police chief of his hometown of Barotac Nuevo. As early as his elementary school years, he represented Western Visayas in the Palarong Pambansa.

Club career
Calogdong is a long time player of Philippine Air Force F.C. and was an enlisted member of the air force. He played for the club in the United Football League until 2012. He moved to another UFL club, Green Archers United in January 2013.

Caligdon had a chance to play for another club when in January 2015, Cebu-based UC-ERCO Bro Nationals attempted to acquire service of several UFL players including himself through a loan for their stint at the 2014–15 PFF National Men's Club Championship finals. However the UFL blocked the loan move and insisted that players from the UFL can't play for other clubs even in competitions hosted by the Philippine Football Federation. The UFL insists that if Caligdong and other loaned players by ERCO suited for the club they can't return to their mother club. This is after other UFL teams complained the loaning of players from Green Archers United.

International career 
Caligdong made his debut in the 2004 Tiger Cup
, playing all four matches and scoring three goals. Two of those goals came in the 89th and 92nd minute in the 2–1 win over Timor-Leste, making it the first ever victory of the Philippines in the ASEAN Football Championship.

He has also played for the Philippines U-23 at the 2005 Southeast Asian Games and in the pre-SEA Games tournament where he scored against Myanmar and Timor-Leste.

On the first match of the Philippines in the Qualifying playoff round of the 2012 AFC Challenge Cup qualification against Mongolia, Caligdong scored a goal in the 43rd minute.

On September 30, 2011, Caligdong scored two goals in a draw against Hong Kong and two more goals on October 4 against Macau in the 2011 Long Teng Cup. Caligdong, who shrugged off injuries to score both goals against Macau, emerged the top scorer for the tournament, earning the Golden Boot trophy.

On September 29, 2012, Caligdong scored a goal on the 34th minute in the last match of the 2012 Philippine Peace Cup versus Chinese Taipei which ended in a 3–1 score line. The Philippines got the championship title with a 3 win, no draw and no loss record.

On November 27, 2012, Caligdong who came in as a substitute in the 2nd half and scored an important goal for the Philippines in a 1–0 victory against Vietnam in the 2012 AFF Suzuki Cup. The Philippines eventually finished second in the group stage and qualified for the semi finals with a 2 win, 1 loss record.

In November 2014, Caligdong announced his retirement from international football citing issues on maintaining fitness and plans to focus more on his club.

International goals 
Scores and results list the Philippines' goal tally first.

Coaching career

Caligdong obtained a "C" Coaching License sometime in 2014 and will coach the Green Archers United youth team. He is also aspiring to become an assistant coach for the national football teams.

By March 2016, Caligdong is now the head coach of the national under-14 team and a playing assistant coach at Green Archers United senior team. In May 2018, Caligdong became the head coach of the University of Perpetual Help football team which plays in the National Collegiate Athletic Association (NCAA) of the Philippines succeeding Aaron Nebreja. Sometime in 2018, Caligdong and his family emigrated to Canada.

Caligdong has acquired an AFC B license, UEFA B license, and a Canada B license by June 2020. By that time Caligdong is already coaching local teams in Ontario, Canada: as head coach of the Ontario Development League Boys Under-15 team and as an assistant coach of North Mississauga SC's Under-13 team.

Personal life
Emelio Caligdong is married to Renrose with whom he has three children. His family has been planning on emigrating to Texas as early as 2008 but such plans has been delayed due to Caligdong's football career. In 2018, they moved to Ontario, Canada instead of pursuing earlier plans to move to the United States. Caligdong's wife also has two sisters residing in Canada.

Honours

Club
Philippine Air Force
UFL Division 1: 2010, 2011
UFL Cup: 2009, 2011
UFL Cup: 2009, 2011

National team
Long Teng Cup: Third 2010
Long Teng Cup: Runners-up 2011
AFC Challenge Cup: Third 2012
Philippine Peace Cup: 2012, 2013

Individual
Long Teng Cup Golden Boot: 1
 2011
PFF National Men's Club Championship Golden Boot: 1
 2013
Philippine Sportswriters Association Mr. Football Title: 1
 2011
The Outstanding Young Men (TOYM) Award for Sports: 1
 2012

References

External links 

1982 births
Living people
Philippine Air Force personnel
Filipino footballers
Footballers from Iloilo
Philippines international footballers
Association football wingers
Philippine Air Force F.C. players
Green Archers United F.C. players
Filipino football head coaches
Visayan people
Filipino expatriates in Canada